The Nasketucket River is a small river (stream) arising in Fairhaven, Massachusetts, and emptying about 3 miles downstream into Little Bay, a branch of Nasketucket Bay on Buzzards Bay.

References

Fairhaven, Massachusetts
Rivers of Bristol County, Massachusetts
Rivers of Massachusetts